Jaroslav Bába (born 2 September 1984 in Karviná) is a Czech high jumper.

At the 2004 IAAF World Indoor Championships he jumped 2.25 metres, winning a joint bronze medal along with Germaine Mason and Ştefan Vasilache. In the same year he won the Olympic bronze medal with a jump of 
2.34 m.

In 2005 he jumped a new personal best of 2.36 m in July in Rome, and later finished fifth at the World Championships. He had 2.37 m on the indoor track in Arnstadt from February of the same year. He did not compete in the 2006 season. During the summer of 2009 he spent several weeks in  England to improve his English language skills.

Achievements

References

1984 births
Living people
Czech male high jumpers
Olympic athletes of the Czech Republic
Olympic bronze medalists for the Czech Republic
Athletes (track and field) at the 2004 Summer Olympics
Athletes (track and field) at the 2008 Summer Olympics
Athletes (track and field) at the 2012 Summer Olympics
Athletes (track and field) at the 2016 Summer Olympics
Sportspeople from Karviná
World Athletics Championships athletes for the Czech Republic
Medalists at the 2004 Summer Olympics
Olympic bronze medalists in athletics (track and field)